"Somebody Else's Moon" is a song written by Tom Shapiro and Paul Nelson, and recorded by American country music singer Collin Raye. It was released in March 1993 as the third single from his album, In This Life. The song reached the Top 5 on the U.S. Billboard Hot Country Singles & Tracks chart and peaked at number 11 on the Canadian RPM Country Tracks chart.

Chart performance
The song debuted at number 73 on the chart dated April 3, 1993. It charted for 20 weeks on that chart, and peaked at number 5 on the chart dated July 3, 1993.

Charts

References

1993 singles
Collin Raye songs
Songs written by Tom Shapiro
Song recordings produced by Garth Fundis
Epic Records singles
Songs written by Paul Nelson (songwriter)
1992 songs